Masahiko Harada (born April 5, 1943), better known as Fighting Harada, is a Japanese former professional boxer. He is a world champion in two weight classes, having held the NYSAC, WBA, and The Ring undisputed flyweight titles from 1962 to 1963 and the WBA, WBC, and The Ring undisputed bantamweight titles from 1965 and 1968. He is currently the president of the Japanese boxing association.

Harada was arguably one of Japan's most popular boxers; his fame reached international status, and Puerto Rico's Wilfredo Gómez declared that Harada was his idol as a child. Harada was inducted into the International Boxing Hall of Fame in 1995. In 2002, he was ranked as the 32nd greatest boxer of the past 80 years by Ring magazine.

Biography 
Harada began fighting as a professional on February 21, 1960, knocking out Isami Masui in round four, in Tokyo. He won his first twenty four bouts. Among the notables he beat during that span were Ken Morita, who later became a respected boxing official and who was beaten by Harada on June 26 in the first round, and future world champion Hiroyuki Ebihara, who was undefeated in nine fights before meeting Harada and who was beaten by Harada on December 24, by a decision in six rounds.

On June 15, 1962, he suffered his first defeat, being beaten on points by Edmundo Esparza over ten rounds in Tokyo.

After one more win, Harada received his first world title try: on October 10 of that year, he became the Lineal and WBA world flyweight champion by knocking out Pone Kingpetch in the eleventh round, in Tokyo.

A rematch followed, and Harada lost the title in his first defense, being outpointed by Kingpetch over fifteen rounds on January 12, 1963 in Bangkok, Thailand. This was Harada's first fight outside Japan.

Harada posted four more wins in a row before losing by knockout in six to Jose Medel on September 26.

After that loss, Harada posted another winning streak, which reached seven before he was given another world title shot. Among the boxers he beat was top contenders Ray Asis, Oscar Reyes, and Katsutoshi Aoki.

On May 18, 1965, Harada extended his winning streak to eight, when he defeated Lineal, WBA and WBC bantamweight champion Eder Jofre in Nagoya, by a fifteen round decision, to win his second world title. Jofre was undefeated in fifty fights coming into this bout, and considered by many of his fans to be invincible.

On November 30, he defeated perennial British contender Alan Rudkin by a fifteen round decision to retain the title. On June 1, 1966, he and Jofre had a rematch in Tokyo, and Harada defeated Jofre once again, by a fifteen round decision. Losing for the second time to Harada prompted Jofre to retire; he would make a successful comeback three years later. Harada was the only boxer to beat Jofre.

After two more, non-title wins, Harada had a chance to avenge his defeat against Jose Medel. On January 3, 1967, Harada retained his world bantamweight title with a fifteen round decision over Medel in Nagoya.

On July 4 he retained the title against Colombian Bernardo Caraballo, a fighter who was well liked in his country. Harada outpointed him over fifteen rounds.

On February 27, 1968, Lionel Rose became the first Indigenous Australian to become a world boxing champion, when he outpointed Harada over fifteen rounds in Tokyo. Having lost his world bantamweight crown, Harada then set his sights on regaining it.

He won four of his next five fights. Among those he defeated were American Dwight Hawkins and his countryman Nobuo Chiba. His lone loss during that span came at the hands of American Alton Colter by a ten round, split decision. Then, he received another world title shot.

On July 28, 1969, after the WBA and WBC had split the world bantamweight title, Harada fought Australia's Johnny Famechon for the WBC world featherweight belt. The fight was held in Sydney, and the referee and only judge was the legendary former world featherweight champion Willie Pep. Pep scored the fight a tie (draw), but Famechon's fans rallied over the call by booing Pep, who then announced he had miscalculated his scorecard and actually had Famechon ahead, making Harada a loser by a fifteen round decision. This fight was, nevertheless, controversial because of the nature of its ending, and the WBC clamoured for a rematch.

After a knockout win in eight rounds over Pat Gonzalez, the rematch came. Harada's management wanted the fight to be held in Tokyo, and so, on January 6, 1970, Harada and Famechon met once again, this time at Tokyo's Metropolitan Gym. Harada dropped the champion in round ten, but Famechon recovered, knocking Harada off the ring in round fourteen and retaining the title by knockout in that round. This was Harada's last fight as a professional.

Harada led a rather quiet life after retirement. In 1996, he was elected into the International Boxing Hall of Fame in Canastota, New York. Coincidentally, Wilfredo Gómez was inducted in the same ceremony. After Gómez expressed that Harada was his idol, Harada responded, using an interpreter, that Gómez had, in turn, become one of his favorite fighters as well. Eder Jofre, one of the boxers Harada beat to win world titles, is also enshrined at the IBHOF.

Masahiko Harada became president of the Japanese Boxing Commission in 2002.

On January 28, 2004, as he was driving home from his office, Harada experienced a headache and he was found to have a brain hemorrhage which required hospitalisation. By 2005 he was recovering steadily.

On November 7, 2019 he presented the Muhammad Ali Trophy to Naoya Inoue after his victory over Nonito Donaire to win the 2018–19 World Boxing Super Series – bantamweight division tournament.

Professional boxing record

See also 
 List of flyweight boxing champions
 List of bantamweight boxing champions
 List of Japanese boxing world champions
 Boxing in Japan

References

External links 
 
 Fighting Harada Boxing Gym
 Masahiko "Fighting" Harada – CBZ Profile
 https://boxrec.com/media/index.php/National_Boxing_Association%27s_Quarterly_Ratings:_1962

|-

|-

|-

|-

|-

|-

|-

|-

1943 births
Living people
Flyweight boxers
Bantamweight boxers
Featherweight boxers
World Boxing Association champions
World Boxing Council champions
The Ring (magazine) champions
World flyweight boxing champions
World bantamweight boxing champions
International Boxing Hall of Fame inductees
Boxing commentators 
Sportspeople from Tokyo
Japanese male boxers
Presidents of the Japan Pro Boxing Association